Deh Now-ye Bahman (also Romanized as Dehnow Bahman; also known as Dehnow) is a village in Javid-e Mahuri Rural District, in the Central District of Mamasani County, Fars Province, Iran. At the 2006 census, its population was 93, in 21 families.

References 

Populated places in Mamasani County